National Tertiary Route 801, or just Route 801 (or ) is a National Road Route of Costa Rica, located in the Limón province.

Description
In Limón province the route covers Talamanca canton (Bratsi district).

References

Highways in Costa Rica